Raat Bhore is a 1955 Bengali drama film directed by Mrinal Sen. This was Sen's first film.

Plot

Cast 
 Uttam Kumar
 Sabitri Chatterjee
 Chhabi Biswas
 Jahor Roy
 Kali Banerjee
 Chhaya Debi
 Shobha Sen
 Keshto Mukherjee
 Biren Chattopadhyay
 Dhiraj Das
 Swagata Chakarborty
 Debi Neogi
 Mamtaz Ahmed

References

Citations

Notes

External links 
 
 Raat Bhore in Mrinal Sen's official website
 http://www.epaper.eisamay.com/epapermain.aspx?queryed=9&eddate=9%2f6%2f2015

1955 films
Films directed by Mrinal Sen
Bengali-language Indian films
1950s Bengali-language films
1955 directorial debut films
Indian romantic drama films
1955 romantic drama films
Indian black-and-white films